As the Yuan dynasty ended, many Mongols as well as the Muslims who came with them remained in China. Most of their descendants took Chinese names and became part of the diverse cultural world of China. During the following Ming rule (1368–1644), Muslims truly adopted Chinese culture. Most became fluent in Chinese and adopted Chinese names and the capital, Nanjing, became a center of Islamic learning. As a result, the Muslims became "outwardly indistinguishable" from the Chinese.

The Ming dynasty saw the rapid decline in the Muslim population in the sea ports. This was due to the closing of all seaport trade with the outside world except for rigid government-sanctioned trade.

Integration

As a result of increasing isolationism by the Ming dynasty, immigration from Muslim countries slowed down drastically however, and the Muslims in China became increasingly isolated from the rest of the Islamic world, gradually becoming more sinicized, adopting the Chinese language and Chinese dress. Muslims became fully integrated into Chinese society. One interesting example of this synthesis was the process by which Muslims changed their names.

Muslims also sought to integrate themselves with the majority of the Chinese people during this time, making themselves undistinguished as possible to assimilate.

Foreign origin Muslims adopted the Chinese character which sounded the most phonetically similar to the beginning syllables of their Muslim names – Ha for Hasan, Hu for Hussain and Sa'I for Said and so on. Han who converted to Islam kept their own surnames like Kong, Zhang.
Chinese surnames that are very common among Muslim families are Mo, Mai, and Mu – names adopted by the Muslims who had the surnames Muhammad, Mustafa and Masoud. 

Muslim customs of dress and food also underwent a synthesis with Chinese culture. The Islamic modes of dress and dietary rules were maintained within a Chinese cultural framework. Chinese Islamic cuisine is heavily influenced by Beijing cuisine, with nearly all cooking methods identical, and differs only in material due to religious restrictions.  As a result, northern Islamic cuisine is often included as part of Beijing cuisine.

During the Ming dynasty, Chinese Islamic traditions of writing began to develop, including the practice of writing Chinese using the Arabic script (xiaojing) and distinctly Chinese forms of decorative calligraphy. The script is used extensively in mosques in eastern China, and to a lesser extent in Gansu, Ningxia, and Shaanxi.  A famous Sini calligrapher is Hajji Noor Deen Mi Guangjiang.

Mosque Architecture began to follow traditional Chinese architecture. A good example is the Great Mosque of Xi'an, whose current buildings date from the Ming dynasty. Western Chinese mosques were more likely to incorporate minarets and domes while eastern Chinese mosques were more likely to look like pagodas.

In time, the Muslims who were descendants of immigrants from Muslim countries began to speak local dialects and to read in Chinese Language.

In Qinghai, the Salar Muslims voluntarily came under Ming dynasty rule. The Salar clan leaders each capitulated to the Ming dynasty around 1370. The chief of the four upper clans around this time was Han Pao-yuan and Ming granted him office of centurion, it was at this time the people of his four clans took Han as their surname. The other chief Han Shan-pa of the four lower Salar clans got the same office from Ming, and his clans were the ones who took Ma as their surname.

By the middle of the 16th century occasional Europeans who had a chance to travel in China start reporting on the existence and the way of life of the Chinese Muslims. The Portuguese smuggler Galeote Pereira, who was captured off the Fujian coast in 1549, and then spent a few years in Fujian and Guangxi, has a few pages on the Chinese Muslims ("Moors" to the Portuguese) in his report (published 1565). He felt that in both places the Muslim community was quickly assimilating into the Chinese mainstream.

Intermarriage laws
Both Mongol and Central Asian Semu Muslim women and men of both sexes were required by Ming Code to marry Han Chinese after the first Ming Emperor Hongwu passed the law in Article 122.

Integration was mandated through intermarriage by Ming law, ethnic minorities had to marry people of other ethnic groups. Marriage between upper class Han Chinese and Hui Muslims was low, since upper class Han Chinese men would both refuse to marry Muslim women, and forbid their daughters from marrying Muslim men, since they did not want to convert due to their upper class status. Only low and mean status Han Chinese men would convert if they wanted to marry a Hui woman. Ming law allowed Han Chinese men and women to not have to marry Hui, and only marry each other, while Hui men and women were required to marry a spouse not of their race.

The Ming policy towards the Islamic religion was tolerant, while their racial policy towards ethnic minorities was of integration through forced marriage. Muslims were allowed to practice Islam, but if they were members of other ethnic groups they were required by law to intermarry, so Hui had to marry Han since they were different ethnic groups, with the Han often converting to Islam.

After the Oghuz Turkmen Salars moved from Samarkand in Central Asia to Xunhua, Qinghai in the early Ming dynasty, they converted Tibetan women to Islam and the Tibetan women were taken as wives by Salar men. A Salar wedding ritual where grains and milk were scattered on a horse by the bride was influenced by Tibetans. After they moved into northern Tibet, the Salars originally practiced the same Gedimu (Gedem) variant of Sunni Islam as the Hui people and adopted Hui practices like using the Hui Jingtang Jiaoyu Islamic education during the Ming dynasty which derived from Yuan dynasty Arabic and Persian primers. One of the Salar primers was called "Book of Diverse Studies" (雜學本本 Zaxue Benben) in Chinese. The version of Sunni Islam practiced by Salars was greatly impacted by Salars marrying with Hui who had settled in Xunhua. The Hui introduced new Naqshbandi Sufi orders like Jahriyya and Khafiyya to the Salars and eventually these Sufi orders led to sectarian violence involving Qing soldiers (Han, Tibetans and Mongols) and the Sufis which included the Chinese Muslims (Salars and Hui). Ma Laichi brought the Khafiyya Naqshbandi order to the Salars and the Salars followed the Flowered mosque order (花寺門宦) of the Khafiyya. He preached silent dhikr and simplified Qur'an readings bringing the Arabic text Mingsha jing (明沙經, 明沙勒, 明沙爾 Minshar jing) to China.

The Kargan Tibetans, who live next to the Salar, have mostly become Muslim due to the Salars. The Salar oral tradition recalls that it was around 1370 in which they came from Samarkand to China. The later Qing dynasty and Republic of China Salar General Han Youwen was born to a Tibetan woman named Ziliha (孜力哈) and a Salar father named Aema (阿额玛).

Tibetan women were the original wives of the first Salars to arrive in the region as recorded in Salar oral history. The Tibetans agreed to let their Tibetan women marry Salar men after putting up several demands to accommodate cultural and religious differences. Hui and Salar intermarry due to cultural similarities and following the same Islamic religion. Older Salars married Tibetan women but younger Salars prefer marrying other Salars. Han and Salar mostly do not intermarry with each other unlike marriages of Tibetan women to Salar men. Salars however use Han surnames. Salar patrilineal clans are much more limited than Han patrilinial clans in how much they deal with culture, society or religion. Salar men often marry a lot of non-Salar women and they took Tibetan women as wives after migrating to Xunhua according to historical accounts and folk histories. Salars almost exclusively took non-Salar women as wives like Tibetan women while never giving Salar women to non-Salar men in marriage except for Hui men who were allowed to marry Salar women. As a result Salars are heavily mixed with other ethnicities.

Salars in Qinghai live on both banks of the Yellow river, south and north, the northern ones are called Hualong or Bayan Salars while the southern ones are called Xunhua Salars. The region north of the Yellow river is a mix of discontinuous Salar and Tibetan villages while the region south of the yellow river is solidly Salar with no gaps in between, since Hui and Salars pushed the Tibetans on the south region out earlier. Tibetan women who converted to Islam were taken as wives on both banks of the river by Salar men. The term for maternal uncle (ajiu) is used for Tibetans by Salars since the Salars have maternal Tibetan ancestry. Tibetans witness Salar life passages in Kewa, a Salar village and Tibetan butter tea is consumed by Salars there as well. Other Tibetan cultural influences like Salar houses having four corners with a white stone on them became part of Salar culture as long as they were not prohibited by Islam. Hui people started assimilating and intermarrying with Salars in Xunhua after migrating there from Hezhou in Gansu due to the Chinese Ming dynasty ruling the Xunhua Salars after 1370 and Hezhou officials governed Xunhua. Many Salars with the Ma surname appear to be of Hui descent since a lot of Salars now have the Ma surname while in the beginning the majority of Salars had the Han surname. Some example of Hezhou Hui who became Salars are the Chenjia (Chen family) and Majia (Ma family) villages in Altiuli where the Chen and Ma families are Salars who admit their Hui ancestry. Marriage ceremonies, funerals, birth rites and prayer were shared by both Salar and Hui as they intermarriaed and shared the same religion since more and more Hui moved into the Salar areas on both banks of the Yellow river. Many Hui married Salars and eventually it became far more popular for Hui and Salar to intermarry due to both being Muslims than to non-Muslim Han, Mongols and Tibetans. The Salar language and culture however was highly impacted in the 14th-16th centuries in their original ethnogenesis by marriage with Mongol and Tibetan non-Muslims with many loanwords and grammatical influence by Mongol and Tibetan in their language. Salars were multilingual in Salar and Mongol and then in Chinese and Tibetan as they trade extensively in the Ming, Qing and Republic of China periods on the yellow river in Ningxia and Lanzhou in Gansu.

Salars and Tibetans both use the term maternal uncle (ajiu in Salar and Chinese, azhang in Tibetan) to refer to each other, referring to the fact that Salars are descendants of Tibetan women marrying Salar men. After using these terms they often repeat the historical account how Tibetan women were married by 2,000 Salar men who were the First Salars to migrate to Qinghai. These terms illustrate that Salars were viewed separately from the Hui by Tibetans. According to legend, the marriages between Tibetan women and Salar men came after a compromise between demands by a Tibetan chief and the Salar migrants. The Salar say Wimdo valley was ruled by a Tibetan and he demanded the Salars follow 4 rules in order to marry Tibetan women. He asked them to install on their houses's four corners Tibetan Buddhist prayer flags, to pray with Tibetan Buddhist prayer wheels with the Buddhist mantra om mani padma hum and to bow before statues of Buddha. The Salars refused those demands saying they did not recite mantras or bow to statues since they believed in only one creator god and were Muslims. They compromised on the flags in houses by putting stones on their houses' corners instead of Tibetan Buddhist prayer flags. Some Tibetans do not differentiate between Salar and Hui due to their Islamic religion. In 1996, Wimdo township only had one Salar because Tibetans whined about the Muslim call to prayer and a mosque built in the area in the early 1990s so they kicked out most of the Salars from the region. Salars were bilingual in Salar and Tibetan due to intermarriage with Tibetan women and trading. It is far less likely for a Tibetan to speak Salar. Tibetan women in Xiahe also married Muslim men who came there as traders before the 1930s.

In eastern Qinghai and Gansu there were cases of Tibetan women who stayed in their Buddhist Lamaist religion while marrying Chinese Muslim men and they would have different sons who would be Buddhist and Muslims, the Buddhist sons became Lamas while the other sons were Muslims. Hui and Tibetans married Salars.

The Hongwu Emperor decreed the building of multiple mosques throughout China in many locations. A Nanjing mosque was built by the Xuanzong Emperor.

Freedom
Muslims in Ming dynasty Beijing were given relative freedom by the Chinese, with no restrictions placed on their religious practices or freedom of worship, and being normal citizens in Beijing. In contrast to the freedom granted to Muslims, followers of Tibetan Buddhism and Catholicism suffered from restrictions and censure in Beijing.

Emperors and Islam 

The Hongwu Emperor ordered the building of several mosques in southern China, and wrote a 100 character praise on Islam, Allah and the prophet Muhammad. He had over 10 Muslim Generals in his military. The Emperor built mosques in Nanjing, Yunnan, Guangdong and Fujian. Zhu rebuilt Jin Jue mosque in Nanjing and large numbers of Hui Muslims moved to Nanjing during his rule. He ordered that inscriptions praising Muhammd be put into Mosques.

During the war fighting the Mongols, among the Ming Emperor Zhu Yuanzhang's armies was the Hui Muslim Feng Sheng.

'Ali Akbar Khata'i wrote in his book Khataynameh: “the Emperor [Xiaozong- Hongzhi Emperor (1487-1505)] not only employed many Muslim officials but also had a marked personal inclination toward Islam…., The Kin Tay (Zhengde, r. 1505-1521) had been very friendly with the Muslims and had Muslim warlords under his service....., the eunuchs of the Chinese palace are all Muslims who can practice their faith without any limitations." He also called the Zhengde Emperor as "Khan".

1,200 Muslims who settled in China during the Yuan dynasty were sent "back" from Gansu to Sa-ma-rh-han (Samarkhand), due to a command from the Emperor to the Governor of Gansu to do so.

The Yongle Emperor called for the establishment and repair of Islamic mosques during his reign. Two mosques were built by him, one in Nanjing and the other in Xi'an and they still stand today. Repairs were encouraged and the mosques were not allowed to be converted to any other use.

Pro Muslim inscriptions were found on stelae erected by the Ming Emperors. The Fuzhou and Quanzhou mosques contain the following edict by the Emperor:
"I hereby give you my imperial decree in order to guard your residence. Officials, civil or military, or anyone, are not to offend or insult you. Anyone who offends or insults you against my imperial order will be punished as a criminal".

The Ming dynasty decreed that Manichaeism and Nestorian Christianity were illegal and heterodox, to be wiped out from China, while Islam and Judaism were legal and fit Confucian ideology.

Ming Taizu's tolerant disposition for Muslims and allowing them to practice their religion led to Arab missionaries continually coming to China during the Ming dynasty, prominent ones included Mahamode and Zhanmaluding (Muhammad and Jamal Ul-din respectively).

The Zhengde Emperor was fascinated by foreigners and invited many Muslims to serve as advisors, eunuchs, and envoys at his court. His court was reportedly full of Muslims, and artwork such as porcelain from his court contained Islamic inscriptions in Arabic or Persian. He was also said to wear Muslim clothing and alleged to have converted to Islam. Muslim eunuchs ran many of his state affairs.

An anti pig slaughter edict led to speculation that the Zhengde emperor adopted Islam due to his use of Muslim eunuchs who commissioned the production of porcelain with Persian and Arabic inscriptions in white and blue color. Muslim eunuchs contributed money in 1496 to repairing Niujie Mosque. Central Asian women were provided to the Zhengde Emperor by a Muslim guard and Sayyid Hussein from Hami. The guard was Yu Yung and the women were Uighur. It is unknown who really was behind the anti-pig slaughter edict. The speculation of him becoming a Muslim is remembered alongside his excessive and debauched behavior along with his concubines of foreign origin. Muslim Central Asian girls were favored by Zhengde like how Korean girls were favored by Xuande. A Uighur concubine was kept by Zhengde. Foreign origin Uighur and Mongol women were favored by the Zhengde emperor. Tatar (Mongol) and Central Asian women were bedded by Zhengde. probably studied Persian and Tibetan as well. Zhengde received Central Asian Muslim Semu women from his Muslim guard Yu Yong: The Vice-Commissioner-in-Chief of the Imperial Bodyguard, Yu Yong, resigned from office and was granted the privilege that his son might inherit [his post as] Vice-Commissioner. Yu Yong was a Semu man who excelled in occultism and secret play, [so he] gained [Wuzong's] favor in the Baofang [and the emperor's] attendants all avoided him out of awe. [Yu Yong] also addressed [Wuzong saying] that Huihui women, being fair and gay, greatly outmatch [in beauty those in] China [so that] His Majesty lusted over them. The then Commander-in-Chief, Chang Zuo, was also a Semu man. Yu Yong issued an unauthorized order demanding twelve Hui women from Chang Zuo's
household who were good at the Xiyu ("Western Regions", a geographical concept which encompasses Central Asia and may stretch as far as the Middle East) dance to be presented [to Wuzong]. [He] also persuaded [Wuzong] to summon female family members of marquises (hou) and earls (bo) who were Semu natives to the palace to be trained [in dancing]. He was [therefore] hated within and without the court. Later, His Majesty wished to summon Yu Yong's daughter. Yu Yong used the daughter of his white Muslim (Huizi) neighbor act as a substitute under his daughter's name and presented [her to Wuzong]. Fearing that the affair would be exposed, he applied for resignation 你兒干 你兒幹 Ni'ergan was the name of one of his Muslim concubines.

When the Qing dynasty invaded the Ming dynasty in 1644, Muslim Ming loyalists led by Muslim leaders Milayin, Ding Guodong, and Ma Shouying led a revolt in 1646 against the Qing during the Milayin rebellion in order to drive the Qing out and restore the Ming Prince of Yanchang Zhu Shichuan to the throne as the emperor. The Muslim Ming loyalists were crushed by the Qing with 100,000 of them, including Milayin and Ding Guodong, killed.

Muslim scholarship
The era saw Nanjing become an important center of Islamic study.  From there Wang Daiyu wrote Zhengjiao zhenquan (A Commentary on the Orthodox Faith), while his successor, Liu Zhi, translated Tianfang xingli (Islamic Philosophy) Tianfang dianli (Islamic Ritual) and Tianfang zhisheng shilu (The Last Prophet of Islam).  Another scholar, Hu Dengzhou started a rigorous Islamic school in Nanjing, which taught hadith, the Qur'an, and Islamic law.  The school grew into a fourteen-course system, with classes in Arabic and Persian. Jingtang Jiaoyu was founded during the era of Hu Dengzhou 1522–1597. Other provinces had different systems and different specializations; Lintao and Hezhou provinces had a three-tier educational system in which the youngest children learned the Arabic required for namaz and wudu, and then graduated to more advanced studies.  Shandong province became a center specialized in Persian texts.  As the Hui Muslim community became more diluted, Chinese scholars worked harder to translate texts into Chinese to both provide more texts for Muslims to convince the ruling Han elite that Islam was not inferior to Confucianism.

The work of Islamic geographers which had reached China during the Yuan dynasty was used in the Ming dynasty to draw the Western Regions in the Da Ming Hun Yi Tu, the oldest surviving world map from East Asia.

Prominent Muslims
Although the Yuan dynasty, unlike the western khanates, never converted to Islam, the Mongol rulers of the dynasty elevated the status of foreigners of all religions from west Asia like Muslims, Jews, and Christians versus the Han, Khitan, and Jurchen, and placed many foreigners such as Muslim Persians and Arabs, Jews, Nestorian Christians, Tibetan Buddhist Lamas, and Buddhist Turpan Uyghurs from Central and West Asia in high-ranking posts instead of native Confucian scholars. The state encouraged Central Asian Muslim immigration. The Mongol emperors brought hundreds of thousands of Muslims with them from Persia to help administer the country. Many worked in the elite circles arriving as provincial governors. They were referred to as Semu.

At the same time the Mongols imported Central Asian Muslims to serve as administrators in China, the Mongols also sent Han Chinese and Khitans from China to serve as administrators over the Muslim population in Bukhara in Central Asia, using foreigners to curtail the power of the local peoples of both lands.

Philosophy
Li Nu was a Han Chinese merchant and scholar, and the son of Li Lu in 1376 Li Nu visited Ormuz in Persia, converted to Islam, married a Persian or an Arab girl and brought her back to Quanzhou in Fujian. One of his descendants was the Neo Confucian philosopher Li Zhi who was not a Muslim, their clan stopped practising the religion during his grandfather's generation.

There was a significant amount of influence from Neo-Confucianism in Chinese Islamic thought around this time, to the point where many Muslims thought that they practiced Confucianism in a superior way to Confucianists who did not worship Allah. Buddhist and Taoist esotericism also influenced Muslim intellectuals.

Military generals

Several of the commanders of Zhu Yuanzhang, the founder of the Ming dynasty, were Muslim.

Lan Yu, in 1388, led a strong imperial Ming army out of the Great Wall and won a decisive victory over the Mongols in Mongolia, effectively ending the Mongol dream to re-conquer China. Lan Yu was later killed by the Emperor, along with several others, in a purge of those deemed to be a potential threat to his heir apparent.

Mu Ying was one of the few capable generals who survived the massacre of Emperor Zhu Yuanzhang. He and his descendants guarded Yunnan, a province near Vietnam, until the end of the Ming dynasty. He and other Muslim Generals loyal to the Ming dynasty led Muslim troops to defeat Mongol and Muslims loyal to the Yuan dynasty during the Ming conquest of Yunnan.

Other generals of the Ming dynasty include Feng Sheng, Ding Dexing and Hu Dahai.

In the year 1447, a Muslim Hui general Chen You, financed the restoration of the Dong Si Mosque (literally meaning: Propagation of Brightness Mosque).

Hala Bashi, a Uyghur General from Turpan, fought for the Ming dynasty against Miao rebels during the Miao Rebellions (Ming dynasty). He led Uyghur troops to crush the rebels and settled in Changde, Hunan.

Zheng He
The Ming dynasty also gave rise to who is perhaps the most famous Chinese Muslim, Zheng He, a mariner, explorer, diplomat, and admiral. He was born in 1371 in Yunnan province. He served as a close confidant of the Yongle Emperor (r. 1403–1424), the third emperor of the Ming dynasty. Between 1405 and 1433, the Ming government sponsored a series of seven naval expeditions led by Zheng He into the Indian Ocean, reaching as far away as east Africa. On his voyages, he is known to have heavily subsidized Buddhist temples; upon his returns to China, he restored or constructed temples to Mazu, the Taoist sea goddess, in Nanjing, Taicang, and Nanshan, erecting steles praising her protection. Amateur historian Gavin Menzies claims that Zheng He traveled to West Africa, North America and South America, Greenland, Antarctica and Australia and most of the rest of the world, although this idea is not taken seriously by professional historians.

Foreign policy
The Ming dynasty supported Muslim Sultanates in South East Asia like the Malacca Sultanate, protecting them from Thailand and the Portuguese, allowing them to prosper. It also supported the Muslim Champa state against Vietnam.

Ming dynasty China warned Thailand and the Majapahit against trying to conquer and attack the Malacca sultanate, placing the Malacca Sultanate under Chinese protection as a protectorate, and giving the ruler of Malacca the title of King. The Chinese strengthened several warehouses in Malacca. The Muslim Sultanate flourished due to the Chinese protection against the Thai and other powers who wanted to attack Malacca. Thailand was also a tributary to China and had to obey China's orders not to attack

In response to the Portuguese Capture of Malacca (1511), the Chinese Imperial Government imprisoned and executed multiple Portuguese envoys after torturing them in Guangzhou. Since Malacca was a tributary state to China, the Chinese responded with violent force against the Portuguese. The Malaccans had informed the Chinese of the Portuguese seizure of Malacca, to which the Chinese responded with hostility toward the Portuguese. The Malaccans told the Chinese of the deception the Portuguese used, disguising plans for conquering territory as mere trading activities, and told of all the atrocities committed by the Portuguese. Malacca was under Chinese protection and the Portuguese invasion angered the Chinese.

Due to the Malaccan Sultan lodging a complaint against the Portuguese invasion to the Chinese Emperor, the Portuguese were greeted with hostility from the Chinese when they arrived in China. The Sultan's complaint caused "a great deal of trouble" to Portuguese in China. The Chinese were very "unwelcoming" to the Portuguese. The Malaccan Sultan, based in Bintan after fleeing Malacca, sent a message to the Chinese, which combined with Portuguese banditry and violent activity in China, led the Chinese authorities to execute 23 Portuguese and torture the rest of them in jails. Tomé Pires, a Portuguese trade envoy, was among those who died in the Chinese dungeons. Much of the Portuguese embassy stayed imprisoned for life.

Ming loyalist Muslims

When the Qing dynasty invaded the Ming dynasty in 1644, Muslim Ming loyalists in Gansu led by Muslim leaders Milayin and Ding Guodong led a revolt in 1646 against the Qing during the Milayin rebellion in order to drive the Qing out and restore the Ming Prince of Yanchang Zhu Shichuan to the throne as the emperor. The Muslim Ming loyalists were supported by Hami's Sultan Sa'id Baba and his son Prince Turumtay. The Muslim Ming loyalists were joined by Tibetans and Han Chinese in the revolt. After fierce fighting, and negotiations, a peace agreement was agreed on in 1649, and Milayan and Ding nominally pledged allegiance to the Qing and were given ranks as members of the Qing military. When other Ming loyalists in southern China made a resurgence and the Qing were forced to withdraw their forces from Gansu to fight them, Milayan and Ding once again took up arms and rebelled against the Qing. The Muslim Ming loyalists were then crushed by the Qing with 100,000 of them, including Milayin, Ding Guodong, and Turumtay killed in battle.

The Confucian Hui Muslim scholar Ma Zhu (1640-1710) served with the southern Ming loyalists against the Qing. Zhu Yu'ai, the Ming Prince Gui was accompanied by Hui refugees when he fled from Huguang to the Burmese border in Yunnan and as a mark of their defiance against the Qing and loyalty to the Ming, they changed their surname to Ming.

In Guangzhou, there are three tombs of Ming loyalist Muslims who were martyred while fighting in battle against the Qing in the Manchu conquest of China in Guangzhou. The Ming Muslim loyalists were called "jiaomen sanzhong ("Three defenders of the faith" or "The Muslim's Loyal Trio").

See also
 Islam during the Tang dynasty
 Islam during the Song dynasty
 Islam during the Yuan dynasty
 Islam during the Qing dynasty
 Religion in China
 The Hundred-word Eulogy

Notes

History of Islam in China
Ming dynasty